Hull F.C. (known as the Hull Sharks between 1996 and 1999) is an English rugby league club who have had numerous notable players (1,156 as of 31 October 2018) throughout their history, each player of the rugby league era who has played (and so excludes non-playing substitutes) in a competitive first-class match (including those matches that were subsequently abandoned, expunged or re-played, but excluding friendlies) is included.
 
 
 ^¹ = Played For Hull F.C. During More Than One Period
 ^² = Prior to the 1974–75 season all goals, whether; conversions, penalties, or drop-goals, scored two points, consequently prior to this date drop-goals were often not explicitly documented, and "0²" indicates that drop-goals may not have been recorded, rather than no drop-goals scored. In addition, prior to the 1949–50 season, the Field-goal was also still a valid means of scoring points
 ^³ = During the first two seasons of the Northern Union (now known as the Rugby Football League), i.e. the 1895–96 season and 1896–97 season, conversions were worth 2-points, penalty goals 3-points and drop goals 4-points
 ¢ = player has (potential) links to other rugby league clubs on Wikipedia
 BBC = BBC2 Floodlit Trophy
 CC = Challenge Cup
 CF = Championship Final
 CM = Captain Morgan Trophy
 RT = League Cup, i.e. Player's No. 6, John Player (Special), Regal Trophy
 YC = Yorkshire County Cup
 YL = Yorkshire League

References

External links
 Hull FC Heritage Numbers

Hull F.C.
Hull F.C.
Hull F.C. players